Bedfont Football Club is a semi-professional football club in Bedfont, Greater London, England.

History
The club was established in May 2012 as a merger of Bedfont Football & Social Club and Feltham, taking Feltham's place in Division One of the Combined Counties League. The Bedfont Football & Social Club, meanwhile, contained people involved with Bedfont F.C., who were dissolved in 2010. However, as Feltham had already entered the 2012–13 FA Vase under their name, the club played as Feltham F.C. until being renamed Bedfont & Feltham at the start of the 2013–14 season. That season saw them win the Middlesex Premier Cup, beating Staines Lammas 1–0 in the final.

In 2014–15 the club won the Division One Challenge Cup, beating Worcester Park 4–3 on penalties in the final. The following season saw then finish as runners-up in Division One, earning promotion to the Premier Division. However they were relegated back to Division One at the end of the 2016–17 season. At the end of the 2021–22 season, the club was renamed Bedfont Football Club.

Season-by-season record

Ground
Bedfont play their home games at the Orchard on Hatton Road in Feltham. It has a capacity of 1,200.

Managers
May 2012–August 2014: Wayne Tisson
August 2014–November 2014: Dean Thomas
November 2014–January 2016: Louis Carder-Walcott
February 2016–September 2016: John Cook
September 2016–October 2016: Joe Monks
December 2016–April 2017: Aaron Morgan
April 2017–October 2017: Garry Haylock
October 2017–May 2018: Dan Huxley
May 2018–April 2021: Adam Bessent
May 2021–March 2022: Daniel Ranger
May 2022-: Anthony Bersey

Honours
Combined Counties League
Division One Cup winners 2014–15
Middlesex Premier Cup
Winners 2013–14

Records
Best FA Cup performance: First qualifying round, 2014–15, 2015–16
Best FA Vase performance: Second round, 2019–20

See also
Bedfont F.C. players
Bedfont F.C. managers

References

External links
Official website

 
Football clubs in England
Football clubs in London
Association football clubs established in 2012
2012 establishments in England
Combined Counties Football League
Sport in the London Borough of Hounslow